Famoso may refer to:
 Famoso Raceway, a dragstrip is located north of Bakersfield, California
 Famoso, California, an unincorporated community in Kern County, California
 El Famoso, the nickname of Carlos Hernández (boxer)
 (Sfera Ebbasta album) published in 2020